Danners, Inc was a company based in Indianapolis, Indiana, USA, that operated retail and restaurant outlets. Its largest, and oldest, division was the Danners 5 & 10 chain of five and dime stores, which it closed in 1985.

Danners also operated twelve Cambridge Inn Cafeterias and one Danner Bros. Restaurant and danners!, the company's frame, stationery and crafts store. The variety stores, restaurants and frame and craft stores were all closed down in 1985, in an effort to save the 3-D discount chain. 3-D stood for "Danner's Discount Department Store".

In 1986, 3D Discount had 35 locations throughout Indiana, Illinois and Michigan.

In 1987, Indian L.P. offered to purchase all outstanding shares of Danners, Inc. that it did not already own. It was then merged into the Maxway Corp., which filed Chapter 11 bankruptcy in 1988. When Maxway emerged from bankruptcy in 1989, the Danners, Inc division was listed as defunct. Maxway operated the Macks Stores chain of stores.

Divisions
Danners 5 & 10
3D Discount
Cambridge Inn Cafeterias - 12 locations
Danner Bros. Restaurant

References

Defunct retail companies of the United States
Defunct companies based in Indianapolis